Kheyrabad (also Romanized as Kheyrābād) is a village in Ramjin Rural District, Chaharbagh District, Savojbolagh County, Alborz Province, Iran. At the 2006 census, its population was 127, in 35 families.

References 

Populated places in Savojbolagh County